Witch's Love is a 2018 South Korean television series starring Yoon So-hee, Hyun Woo, Lee Hong-bin, Kim Young-ok, and Go Soo-hee. It aired on MBN's Wednesdays and Thursdays at 23:00 (KST) time slot from July 25 to August 30, 2018.

Synopsis
The series tells the stories of modern-day witches as they explore romance.
Kang Cho-hong is an innocent witch who lives with her two grandmas who own a rice soup place.
Ma Sung-Tae is a businessman who has had childhood trauma.
He wants to find who was responsible for it and where he had his accident.
He meets Kang cho and this will change their lives forever...

Cast

Main
 Yoon So-hee as Kang Cho-hong
 A nosy witch who works as a delivery person in a restaurant run by two other witches. She possesses the power of telekinesis. 
 Hyun Woo as Ma Sung-tae
 A wealthy business man who is also a martial arts expert with childhood trauma.
 Lee Hong-bin as Hwang Jae-wook
 A webtoon illustrator.
 Kim Young-ok as Maeng Ye-soon
 A witch who is an artisan of rice soup.
 Go Soo-hee as Jo Aeng-doo
 A witch who possesses super-human strength.

Supporting
 Choi Jae-sub as Kim Dong-soo
 Sung-tae's secretary.
 Choi Tae-hwan as Choi Min-soo
 Cho-hong's ex-boyfriend.
 Lee Do-yeop

References

External links
  
 
 

Maeil Broadcasting Network television dramas
Korean-language television shows
2018 South Korean television series debuts
2018 South Korean television series endings
South Korean romantic comedy television series
South Korean mystery television series
South Korean fantasy television series
Television series by Kim Jong-hak Production
Witchcraft in television